Raukhivka is an urban-type settlement in Berezivka Raion of Odesa Oblast in Ukraine. Raukhivka hosts the administration of Raukhivka settlement hromada, one of the hromadas of Ukraine. Population:

Economy

Transportation
Raukhivka railway station is on the railway connecting Odesa via Berezivka with Tokarivka and further with Mykolaiv and Kropyvnytskyi. There is some passenger traffic.

The settlement has road access to Odessa and Voznesensk, as well as to Highway M05 connecting Kyiv and Odessa.

References

Urban-type settlements in Berezivka Raion